Novaeratitae is a clade that was originally defined to contain the recent common ancestors of the orders Casuariiformes (emus and cassowaries) and Apterygiformes (kiwis). Recently it has been determined that the elephant birds of the extinct order Aepyornithiformes were the closest relatives of the kiwis, and therefore are part of this group. The implication is that ratites had lost flight independently in each group, as the elephant birds are the only novaeratites found outside Oceania.

References

 
Notopalaeognathae